James 4 is the fourth chapter of the Epistle of James in the New Testament of the Christian Bible. The author identifies himself as "James, a servant of God and of the Lord Jesus Christ" and the epistle is traditionally attributed to James the brother of Jesus, written in Jerusalem between 48 and 61 CE. Alternatively, some scholars argue that it is a pseudographical work written after 61 CE. This chapter continues a directive on wisdom and humility from chapter 3, followed by a warning to the rich.

Text
The original text was written in Koine Greek. This chapter is divided into 17 verses.

Textual witnesses
Some early manuscripts containing the text of this chapter are:

Ancient Greek
Papyrus 100 (late 3rd century; extant verses 1–4; 9–17)
Codex Vaticanus (325-350)
Codex Sinaiticus (330-360)
Codex Alexandrinus (400-440)
Codex Ephraemi Rescriptus (ca. 450; extant: verse 1)
Papyrus 74 (7th century; complete)

Coptic
Papyrus 6 (~AD 350; all verses).

Latin
León palimpsest (7th century; extant verses 4–17)

Passions as Cause of Wars (4:1–3)

Verse 1
Where do wars and fights come from among you? Do they not come from your desires for pleasure that war in your members?
"Wars and fights": or 'conflicts and disputes' not only arise in social circumstances, but can also be 'traced back to the war within human beings'.

Grace to the Humble (4:4–6)

Verse 6
 But He gives more grace. Therefore He says:
“God resists the proud,
But gives grace to the humble.”
Citation from:

Humble before God (4:7–10)

This imperative section implores the readers to submit themselves to God.

God as Only Lawgiver and Judge (4:11–12)
Only God, and no human being, can be the final judge, since it is the privilege of God (cf. ) as the lawgiver.

Tomorrow Belongs to God (4:13–17)

Verse 13
Come now, you who say, “Today or tomorrow, we will go to such and such a city, spend a year there, buy and sell, and make a profit”.
Meyer understands "such and such a city" to mean specific places where traders would base themselves, whereas reformer Martin Luther's interpretation was "this and that city".

Verse 15
 Instead you ought to say, "If the Lord wills, we will live and do this or that."
 "If the Lord wills, we will live and do this or that": this statement is rendered in the Vulgate Latin, Syriac, Arabic, and Ethiopian versions as "if the Lord will, and we shall live, we will do this". Here are two conditions of doing anything: first, it should be agreeable to the determining will and purpose of God, and second, if we should live, since life is so precarious.
let a man never say he will do anything, before he says, "if God will"

Verse 16
 But now you boast in your arrogance. All such boasting is evil.
"Arrogance": can lead one to 'forget God, who governs life' (verse 15; cf. 1 Enoch 94:8).

See also
Related Bible parts: Proverbs 3, Matthew 26, Mark 4, Luke 12, Acts 18, Galatians 5

References

Sources

External links
 King James Bible - Wikisource
English Translation with Parallel Latin Vulgate 
Online Bible at GospelHall.org (ESV, KJV, Darby, American Standard Version, Bible in Basic English)
Multiple bible versions at Bible Gateway (NKJV, NIV, NRSV etc.)

04